Sandhya Sangeet (Bengali: সন্ধ্যা সঙ্গীত) is a poetry book written by Rabindranath Tagore in 1882.  In English it was translated as Evening Songs. The book was followed by Tagore's another poetry collection Prabhat Sangeet (1883).

See also
 List of works by Rabindranath Tagore

References

Indian poetry collections
1881 poems
Poetry collections by Rabindranath Tagore
Bengali_poetry
1881 books